Osage Treaty may refer to:

Osage Treaty (1808) or Treaty of Fort Clark
Osage Treaty (1815), one of the Treaties of Portage des Sioux
Osage Treaty (1818) or Treaty of St. Louis
Osage Treaty (1825)